Mbompo (Mpombo) is a Bantu language of Kasai, Democratic Republic of Congo. Nurse (2003) places it among the Bangi–Moi languages.

References

Bangi-Ntomba languages